The 2017 Southern Miss Golden Eagles football team represented the University of Southern Mississippi in the 2017 NCAA Division I FBS football season. The Golden Eagles played their home games at the M. M. Roberts Stadium in Hattiesburg, Mississippi and competed in the West Division of Conference USA (C–USA). They were led by second-year head coach Jay Hopson. They finished the season 8–5, 6–2 in C-USA play to finish in a tie for second place in the West Division. They were invited to the Independence Bowl where they lost to Florida State.

Schedule
Southern Miss announced its 2017 football schedule on January 26, 2017. The 2017 schedule consists of 6 home and away games in the regular season. The Golden Eagles will host C–USA foes North Texas, UTEP, UAB, and Charlotte, and will travel to UTSA, Louisiana Tech, Rice, and Marshall.

The team will play four non–conference games, two home games against Kentucky from the Southeastern Conference (SEC) and Southern from the Southwestern Athletic Conference, and two road games against ULM from the Sun Belt Conference and Tennessee who is also from the Southeastern Conference.

Schedule Source:

Game summaries

Kentucky

Southern

@ Louisiana–Monroe

North Texas

@ UTSA

UTEP

@ Louisiana Tech

UAB

@ Tennessee

@ Rice

Charlotte

@ Marshall

vs Florida State–Independence Bowl

References

Southern Miss
Southern Miss Golden Eagles football seasons
Southern Miss Golden Eagles football